Charlotte de Lorraine-Armagnac (6 May 1678 – 21 January 1757) was a Princess of Lorraine by birth and daughter of Louis, Count of Armagnac. She was known as Mademoiselle d'Armagnac and died unmarried.

Biography
Charlotte of Lorraine was the eleventh of fourteen children born to Prince Louis de Lorraine, Count d'Armagnac and Catherine de Neufville. She belonged to the House of Guise, a cadet branch of the House of Lorraine, entitled to the rank of prince étranger in France. She was raised with her sister Marie of Lorraine, mother of Louise Hippolyte Grimaldi. Charlotte's own mother was a daughter of Nicolas de Neufville, a Marshal of France and one time governor of Louis XIV.

Styled Mademoiselle d'Armagnac, she was a celebrated beauty at the court and was a favourite of Louis XIV and was described by Madame de Sévigné as a beautiful and likeable woman. After the marriage of her sister Marie to the Duke of Valentinois (future Prince of Monaco) the court paid close attention to the range of suitors that were offered to Charlotte. These included the famous Saint Simon; the Margrave of Ansbach, brother of the future Queen Caroline of Great Britain as well as various other French noblemen.

Another candidate was Louis Alexandre de Bourbon, Count de Toulouse, youngest son of Louis XIV and his mistress Madame de Montespan. Louis opposed the match and gave her a pension in return for her losses. She died unmarried having outlived her many siblings.

Ancestry

References

1678 births
1757 deaths
Princesses of Lorraine
House of Guise
Nobility from Paris
18th-century French nobility
17th-century French nobility